Charlotte Hodgkins-Byrne (born 8 October 1996) is a British rower who competes in international level events. She is the younger sister of World Rowing Championships bronze medalist Mathilda Hodgkins-Byrne.

In 2021, she won a European silver medal in the quadruple sculls in Varese, Italy.

References

1996 births
Living people
Sportspeople from Hereford
British female rowers
Olympic rowers of Great Britain
Rowers at the 2020 Summer Olympics
20th-century British women
21st-century British women